The New York Botanical Garden (NYBG) is a botanical garden at Bronx Park in the Bronx, New York City. Established in 1891, it is located on a  site that contains a landscape with over one million living plants; the Enid A. Haupt Conservatory, a greenhouse containing several habitats; and the LuEsther T. Mertz Library, which contains one of the world's largest collections of botany-related texts. , over a million people visit the New York Botanical Garden annually.

NYBG is also a major educational institution, teaching visitors about plant science, ecology, and healthful eating through NYBG's interactive programming. Nearly 90,000 of the annual visitors are children from underserved neighboring communities. An additional 3,000 are teachers from New York City's public school system participating in professional development programs that train them to teach science courses at all grade levels. NYBG operates one of the world's largest plant research and conservation programs.

NYBG was established in 1891 and the first structures on the grounds opened at the end of that decade. Since 1967, the garden has been listed as a National Historic Landmark, and several buildings have been designated as official New York City landmarks.

Mission statement

History

Context 
As early as 1877, ideas had been circulating in New York City to create a botanical garden; funding could not be obtained at the time, although the efforts led to parkland being set aside for future use. By 1888, the Torrey Botanical Society was promoting the construction of a large botanical garden in New York City. The Garden's creation followed a fund-raising campaign led by the Torrey Botanical Society and Columbia University botanist Nathaniel Lord Britton and his wife Elizabeth Gertrude Britton, who were inspired to emulate the Royal Botanic Gardens in London.

In 1889, the Torrey Botanical Society's members decided to build the botanical garden at Bronx Park in the center of the Bronx, New York City's northernmost borough. The Lorillard family owned most of the land at that location. The city had already been given authorization to acquire the land as part of the 1884 New Parks Act, which was intended to preserve lands that would soon become part of New York City. Some  of land surrounding the Lorillard estate was acquired by the City of New York as part of Bronx Park in 1888–1889.

Establishment 
By act of the New York State Legislature, the New York Botanical Garden was established on April 28, 1891. The garden occupied part of the grounds of the Lorillard estate and a parcel that was formerly the easternmost portion of the campus of St. John's College (now Fordham University); the latter included three graves of the Fordham University Cemetery, which were then relocated. The stated purpose of the act was:

As per the acts of incorporation, a board of directors would manage the NYBG. The board of directors included Columbia College's president and professors of biology, chemistry, and geology; the presidents of the Torrey Society, New York City Board of Education, and the Department of Public Parks' board of commissioners; the Mayor of New York City; and nine other members elected to the board. The legislation would provide  within Bronx Park to the NYBG, and enable the board of directors to construct a library and conservatory, if at least $250,000 was raised within five years. If this condition were reached, the city would then issue $0.5 million in bonds. The principal officers of the new corporation set up for the garden were Cornelius Vanderbilt, Andrew Carnegie and J.P. Morgan, with Nathaniel Lord Britton as the new secretary.

Prominent civic leaders and financiers, including Vanderbilt, Carnegie, and Morgan, agreed to match the City's commitment to finance the buildings and improvements. By May 1895, the $250,000 in bonds had been raised but the plans had not been fully confirmed. The Board of Directors then asked landscape architect Calvert Vaux and his partner, Parks Superintendent Samuel Parsons Jr., to consult on site selection. The north end of Bronx Park was decided as the best location for the NYBG. By August 1895, the architects had started a survey on the site. Because the Bronx River and various small tributaries ran through the park, drainage was a major consideration. Though Vaux's preliminary layout was approved in October 1895, he died the following month. The topographical survey was completed in March 1896. The master plan was created by a team that included Britton & Parsons, as well as landscape engineer John R. Brinley, landscape gardener Samuel Henshaw, botanist Lucien Marcus Underwood, and architects Robert W. Gibson and Lincoln Pierson (the latter from the firm Lord & Burnham).

The LuEsther T. Mertz Library and Enid A. Haupt Conservatory were among the first structures at the NYBG to open. The Library was built between 1897 and 1900, and the Conservatory was built around the same time, being completed in 1902.

Later operations 
For over a century after its opening, the NYBG refused to charge admission. Because of this, as well as insufficient government and private funding, its budget deficit started to increase in the 1950s. After the city cut the NYBG's budget in 1970, the garden was forced to remain closed for 3 to 4 days a week, and officials worried that this could eventually lead to permanent closure. In 1974, for the first time in the botanical garden's history, officials had to annually petition New York State Legislature for funds. That year, the NYBG announced a major renovation to the conservatory and the addition of a building dedicated to displaying plants in different habitats. The next year, budget cuts related to the 1975 New York City fiscal crisis resulted in the NYBG being closed on weekdays for the first time in its history.

In 1988, the NYBG announced a renovation of its museum building, including the addition of a new annex, which was supposed to open in 1991. By the early 1990s, the NYBG facilities were neglected. The garden did not have enough space in its parking lots to accommodate all its visitors, turning away potential guests. Many areas were neglected, except for the  surrounding the conservatory, and a wetland had even been created unintentionally due to a broken sewer. A controversy arose in 1994 when the adjacent Fordham University proposed building a  radio tower for its radio station WFUV directly across from the Haupt Conservatory. The dispute continued until 2002, after several years of failed resolutions, when Montefiore Medical Center offered to move WFUV's antenna to its own facilities.

By the mid-1990s, additions to the NYBG were being undertaken to reverse years of neglect. In 1994 the formerly free garden started charging an admission fee to fund these improvements as well as the continued maintenance of existing facilities. The Everett Children's Garden opened in mid-1998. By 2000, the NYBG had requested $300 million for renovations, including a new gift shop and renovation of the greenhouses and roads. A new visitor center and gift shop were announced the following year, which would replace temporary facilities built in 1990. The new main entrance, with a gift shop, bookstore, plaza, restrooms, cafe, and information kiosks, was completed in 2004 at a cost of $21 million. Meanwhile, the addition of the library annex was delayed to 1994, then to 2000. Construction on the annex started in 1998 and it opened in 2002 as the International Plant Science Center.

Through the next two decades, a number of projects were completed and programs were implemented. In 2004, the Leon Levy Visitor Center opened as the Botanical Garden's main entrance. It included the NYBG Shop and the Pine Tree Café. The following year, the Nolen Greenhouses for Living Collections opened with its publicly accessible Bourke-Sullivan Display House. Off-site, the institution opened The New York Botanical Garden Midtown Education Center in Manhattan in 2010. NYBG added a parking garage, the Peter J. Sharp Building, nearby in 2012, along with a Bedford Gate entrance to the Garden. NYBG restored its Lorillard Snuff Mill in 2010 and it was named the Lillian and Amy Goldman Stone Mill. NYBG's Humanities Research Institute, supported by The Andrew W. Mellon Foundation, was created in 2014 to stimulate public discourse about humankind's relationship with nature and the environment. NYBG opened an on-site restaurant, the Hudson Garden Grill, in 2015. It redesigned and reopened its East Gate entrance in 2017. The Edible Academy, an educational facility for teaching children, families, educators, and the general public about vegetable gardening, nutrition awareness, and environmental stewardship, opened in 2018. In February 2020, NYBG announced that it was partnering with Douglaston Development to create affordable apartments on the northwest edge of the garden.

Grounds

The different spaces

The Garden contains 50 different gardens and plant collections. There is a serene cascade waterfall, as well as wetlands and a  tract of original, never-logged, old-growth New York forest.

Garden highlights include the 1890s-vintage Haupt Conservatory, designed by Lord & Burnham; the Peggy Rockefeller Rose Garden, originally laid out by Beatrix Jones Farrand in 1916; an alpine rock garden, designed and installed by Thomas H. Everett in the 1930s; an Herb Garden, designed by Penelope Hobhouse; and a  conifer collection. The NYBG's extensive research facilities include a propagation center, 550,000-volume research library, and an herbarium of 7.2 to 7.8 million botanical specimens dating back more than three centuries, among the largest in the world.

At the heart of the Garden is the Thain Family Forest, an old-growth forest. It is the largest existing remnant of the original forest which covered all of New York City before the arrival of European settlers in the 17th century. The forest, which was never logged, contains oaks, American beeches, cherry, birch, tulip and white ash trees, some more than two centuries old.

The forest itself is split by the Bronx River, the only freshwater river in New York City, and this stretch of the river includes a riverine canyon and rapids. Along the shores sits the Stone Mill, previously known as the Lorillard Snuff Mill, built in 1840. Sculptor Charles Tefft created the Fountain of Life on the grounds in 1905.

The Ladies' Border, originally commissioned by the Women's Auxiliary Committee in the 1920s, was designed by Ellen Shipman and installed between 1931 and 1933.  In 2000, designer Lynden B. Miller created a new plan for the Ladies' Border. The Jane Watson Irwin Perennial Garden was designed in the 1970s by Dan Kiley and redefined by Miller in the 1980s and again in 2003.

In addition to restoring or redesigning existing gardens and collections, such as the Ladies' Border (2002), the Benenson Ornamental Conifers (2004), the Peggy Rockefeller Rose Garden (2007), the Thain Family Forest (2011), and the Marjorie G. Rosen Seasonal Walk by Piet Oudolf (2014), The New York Botanical Garden added new gardens and collections to its grounds: the Home Gardening Center (2005), the Maureen K. Chilton Azalea Garden (2011) by landscape architect Shavaun Towers of Towers|Golde LLC, and Native Plant Garden (2013), by landscape architect Sheila Brady of Oehme, van Sweden.

Research laboratories

The Pfizer Plant Research Laboratory, built with funding from the National Oceanic and Atmospheric Administration, New York State and New York City, and named for its largest private donor, is a major new research institution at the Garden that opened in 2006. The laboratory is a pure research institution, with projects more diverse than research in universities and pharmaceutical companies.

The laboratory's research emphasis is on plant genomics, the study of how genes function in plant development. One question scientists hope to answer is Darwin's "abominable mystery"; when, where, and why flowering plants emerged. The laboratory's research also furthers the discipline of molecular systematics, the study of DNA as evidence that can reveal the evolutionary history and relationships of plant species. Staff scientists also study plant use in immigrant communities in New York City and the genetic mechanisms by which neurotoxins are produced in some plants, work that may be related to nerve disease in humans.

A staff of 200 trains 42 doctoral students at a time. Since the 1890s, scientists from the NYBG have mounted about 2,000 exploratory missions worldwide to collect plants in the wild.

At the Pfizer Plant Research Laboratory, genomic DNA from many different species of plants is extracted to create a library of the DNA of the world's plants. This collection is stored in a  DNA storage room with 20 freezers housing millions of specimens, including rare, endangered or extinct species. To protect the collection during winter power outages, there is a backup 300-kilowatt electric generator.

The Alfred P. Sloan Foundation has granted the NYBG $572,000 to begin a project called TreeBOL, the Tree Barcode of Life. By sampling the DNA from all 100,000 different species of trees from around the world, TreeBOL will document the diversity of plant life, and advance the process of plant DNA barcoding.

LuEsther T. Mertz Library

Founded in 1899 and named after supporter LuEsther Mertz, the LuEsther T. Mertz Library is located in the northern section of NYBG. A 2002 New York Times article mentioned that the library had 775,000 items and 6.5 million plant specimens in its collection. However, a book published in 2014 by the NYBG mentioned that the library had "550,000 physical volumes and 1,800 journal titles".  the Mertz Library still contained one of the world's largest collections of botany-related texts. Stephen Sinon, who leads the NYBG's special collections, research and archives, called its collection "the largest of its kind in the world under one roof".

The library is housed in what was formerly known as the NYBG's Museum Building or Administration Building. Construction started in 1897 and it was completed in 1900. The structure was designed by Robert W. Gibson in the Renaissance Revival style.

Enid A. Haupt Conservatory

The Enid A. Haupt Conservatory, named after Enid A. Haupt, is a greenhouse near the western end of the NYBG. The conservatory was designed by the major greenhouse company of the late 1890s, Lord and Burnham Co. The design was modeled after the Palm House at the Royal Botanic Garden and Joseph Paxton's Crystal Palace in Italian Renaissance style. Groundbreaking took place on January 3, 1899, and the conservatory was completed in 1902 at a cost of $177,000. The building was constructed by John R. Sheehan under contract for the New York City Department of Parks and Recreation. Since the original construction, major renovations took place in 1935, 1950, 1978, and 1993.

The conservatory houses numerous tropical plants and flowers, cacti and other desert plants, and rainforest vegetation. In summer months, the two pools adjacent to the conservatory display many varieties of lotuses and water lilies.

William & Lynda Steere Herbarium 
The William & Lynda Steere Herbarium, in the International Plant Science Center behind the library, is one of the largest herbaria in the world, with approximately 7.2 million to 7.8 million specimens. after the French National Museum of Natural History in Paris. Founded in 1891, the herbarium quickly became a repository for many important collections. In 1895 the garden incorporated the herbarium of Columbia College, an acquisition of approximately 600,000 specimens, including the private herbaria of John Torrey and C. F. Meisner. In 1945 the garden incorporated the herbaria of the Columbia College of Pharmacy and Princeton University.  The herbarium is named after William Steere (son of William C. Steere) and his wife Lynda, who endowed the herbarium in 2002.

The Index Herbariorum code assigned to this botanic garden is NY and it is used when citing housed specimens.

School of Professional Horticulture 
In 1932, Thomas H. Everett expanded an existing training program into a robust curriculum for developing professional horticulturists.  Patterned after diploma programs at the Royal Botanic Gardens, Kew and the Royal Botanic Garden Edinburgh, the School for Gardeners combined academic studies with hands-on practical experience in a two-year, full-time program. With the exception of a hiatus during and after the Second World War, the School has trained students since then. Now called the School of Professional Horticulture, this fully-accredited program continues to develop horticulturists of the highest caliber for positions in both public and private gardens. After successfully completing the program, students receive The New York Botanical Garden's Diploma in Horticulture.

Exhibitions
The New York Botanical Garden has mounted public exhibitions throughout its history. In 1992, NYBG began presenting what would eventually be called the Holiday Train Show, an annual exhibition of model trains running through a display of New York landmarks made of natural materials. In 2002, it introduced The Orchid Show, an annual exhibition of orchid displays and designed installations with changing themes. Beginning in 2007, the Garden added an annual fall exhibition of kiku, Japanese chrysanthemums trained to grow in modern and ancient forms. 

The New York Botanical Garden has also presented large-scale, stand-alone exhibitions, including: Sculpture from the Museum of Modern Art at The New York Botanical Garden (2002), Chihuly at The New York Botanical Garden (2006), Darwin's Garden: An Evolutionary Adventure (2008), Moore in America: Monumental Sculpture at The New York Botanical Garden (2008–2009), Emily Dickinson's Garden: The Poetry of Flowers (2010), Spanish Paradise: Gardens of the Alhambra (2011), Monet's Garden (2012), Manolo Valdés: Monumental Sculpture (2012), Frida Kahlo: Art, Garden, Life (2015), Impressionism: American Gardens on Canvas (2016), CHIHULY (2017), Georgia O'Keeffe: Visions of Hawai'i (2018), Brazilian Modern: The Living Art of Roberto Burle Marx (2019), and KUSAMA: Cosmic Nature (2021).

Executive leadership 
 Dr. Nathaniel Lord Britton (1891–1929)
 Elmer D. Merrill (1930–1935)
 Dr. Marshall A. Howe (1935–1936)
 Dr. Henry A. Gleason (acting, 1937–1938)
 Dr. William J. Robbins (1938–1958)
 Dr. William C. Steere (1958–1972)
 Dr. Howard S. Irwin (1973–1979)
 James M. Hester (1980–1989)
 Gregory Long (1989–2018)
 Dr. Carrie Rebora Barratt (2018–2020)
 Jennifer Bernstein (2021–Present)

Publications 

The NYBG published The Garden Journal from 1977 to 1990 and from 1931 has produced the scientific journal, Brittonia.

Landmark status 
The New York Botanical Garden was declared a National Historic Landmark in 1967. In addition, three structures are designated as individual New York City landmarks: the Enid A. Haupt Conservatory (designated in 1973), the LuEsther T. Mertz Library (2009), and the Lorillard Snuff Mill (1966, also separately on the National Register of Historic Places).

See also 

 Education in New York City
 List of herbaria in North America
 List of botanical gardens and arboretums in New York
 List of museums and cultural institutions in New York City
 List of National Historic Landmarks in New York City
 National Register of Historic Places listings in Bronx County, New York
 Other botanical gardens in New York City
 Brooklyn Botanic Garden
 Queens Botanical Garden
 Staten Island Botanical Garden

References

External links 

 
 Plant Talk: Inside The New York Botanical Garden blog
 
 Brittonia at HathiTrust Digital Library
 Brittonia at SCImago Journal Rank
 Brittonia at Botanical Scientific Journals
 
 

 
1891 establishments in New York (state)
Agricultural buildings and structures on the National Register of Historic Places in New York (state)
Agricultural buildings and structures on the National Register of Historic Places
Botanical research institutes
Bronx Park
Education in New York City
Education in the Bronx
Environmental organizations based in New York City
Fordham, Bronx
Greenhouses in New York (state)
Herbaria in the United States
Institutions accredited by the American Alliance of Museums
Japanese gardens in the United States
Museums in the Bronx
National Historic Landmarks in New York City
National Register of Historic Places in the Bronx
Natural history museums in New York (state)
Parks in the Bronx
Parks on the National Register of Historic Places in New York City
Protected areas of the Bronx
Science museums in New York City
Tourist attractions in the Bronx
Urban forests in the United States